Marcy House may refer to:

Mrs. R. Marcy House, Southbridge, Massachusetts, listed on the National Register of Historic Places (NRHP)
Marcy Houses, public housing complex operated by the New York City Housing Authority and located in the Bedford-Stuyvesant neighborhood, New York City
Bradley H. Marcy House, also known as Cobblestone House, Eau Claire, Wisconsin, NRHP-listed